Marriage Under Fire: Why We Must Win This Battle is a book by Evangelical Christian leader James Dobson, published in 2004 by Multnomah Publishers. The book examines the same-sex marriage movement from an opponent's point of view. Dobson discusses the history of the movement, gives arguments against its influence, advocates the Federal Marriage Amendment, criticizes what he views as judicial activism, and exhorts opponents to mobilize.

External links
  Book excerpt at Crosswalk.com

References

2004 non-fiction books
American political books
Books about politics of the United States
English-language books
Same-sex marriage in the United States